Show is a 2002 Indian Telugu-language experimental film written and directed by Neelakanta, starring Manjula Ghattamaneni and Surya. The film won National Film Award for Best Feature Film in Telugu and was premiered in the Indian Panorama section at the International Film Festival of India. Neelakanta received National Film Award for Best Screenplay for the film. The film also won three Nandi Awards.

Plot
Ridhima, an executive from Delhi-based pharmaceutical company visits a remote village in Andhra Pradesh to make a deal on patents with a professor who invented a new drug. The professor leaves a note that he would return late as he had to attend some urgent work and she shall wait for his arrival. At that time Madhav Rao, a junior advocate who supervises the event of patent selling arrives at that place. Ridhima is a fun-loving unmarried girl and she has a boyfriend called Sanjay. Madhav Rao is frustrated about his profession which he doesn't like and he was a depressed married guy because of his taunting wife Sudha. In the lonely professor's resort, they become friends. Then to kill some time Ridhima asks Madhav that she will give her month's salary 30,000 to anyone who entertains her at least an hour. Then, Madhav makes a prank on her acting as a psycho which hurts Ridhima but they remain friends and she learns that Madhav once tried in acting for five years but he failed to achieve in his career and became a junior advocate. Then to kill some time Madhav gives an idea to make a play of a husband and wife which is going to divorce. But Ridhima doesn't show any interest on the play but she accepts because to kill some time until the professor comes. But the play stops by Madhav which hurts him because of disinterest of Ridhima on the play. After that Ridhima apologises to Madhav he eventually accepts then Madhav makes a lavish lunch which is full of favourites of Ridhima. After lunch Ridhima says that she can't act then Madhav encourages her to develop confidence to make her act then they resume the same play.

According to the play they name themselves as Sandhya and Subba Rao who are going to discuss their relationship which makes a patch up or going to an end on that resort. While in the acting Madhav remembers her wife Sudha's words coincidentally spoken by Sandhya it frustrates him more. Slowly he came out from the play and he feels that it was going real and argue with her seriously. Then finally in the heated argument, Sandhya confesses that she is loving Sanjay and he is also waiting for her then Madhav asks about his son Shambu then frustrated Sandya replies to die both of them in a well. It makes Madhav angry and beats Sandhya mercilessly then Madhav confesses his love on her how he compromised with his life for her. Then Ridhima realises it is not a drama and understands that Madhav became crazy and understands that his love on his wife. Then Madhav tries to kill himself then to stop him Ridhima tries to make him realise that it was a drama by clapping on him for his actions and the show became an end. Then Madhav regains his senses and realises what he has done and apologises to her.

Cast 
Manjula Ghattamaneni as Ridhima, an executive from a Delhi-based pharmaceutical company who plays Sandhya in the play
Surya as Madhav Rao, a junior lawyer who plays Subharao in the play
Lakshmi Ratan as Professor Krishna Rao

Reception 
Idlebrain.com rated the film 4/5 and called the film "picture perfect." The praised the film's screenplay by adding that: "The screenplay of Show is excellent. Having just 2 main roles in the film and running the show for two hours is not an easy task. It needs excellent command on the script and perfect conviction in the subject."

Sankeetana Varma of the Film Companion writing about the film in February 2020 stated that: "This film [Show] doesn’t work only as an eccentric experiment. It has moments of great depth and understanding." Varma also praised the pefromances of the lead cast by adding that, "..the actors, especially Manjula, feel like they’re performing even when they’re alone in the frame."

Awards
National Film Awards

2003:National Film Award for Best Feature Film in Telugu
2003:National Film Award for Best Screenplay - Neelakanta
Nandi Awards
2003:Special Jury Award for Best Performance - Surya
2003: Special Jury Award for Producer - Manjula
2003: Best Screenplay Writer - Neelakanta

References

External links

2002 films
2000s Telugu-language films
Indian avant-garde and experimental films
Films whose writer won the Best Original Screenplay National Film Award
Best Telugu Feature Film National Film Award winners